Dunbar was a 64-gun second rate ship of the line of the English Royal Navy, originally built for the navy of the Commonwealth of England at Deptford, and launched in 1656. Renamed HMS Henry in 1660, she served until 1682, when she was lost in an accidental fire.

Description
Rated at 1,082 tons builder's old measurement, she was equipped with 64 guns. By 1677 her armament had been increased to 82 guns.

Service
Dunbar was built by Callis at Deptford, Kent in 1656 for the Commonwealth Navy. After the Restoration of the monarchy in 1660, she was renamed HMS Henry.

In 1661/1662 HMS Henry was the flagship of Admiral John Mennes taking the Earl of Peterborough and the first troops of the new Garrison to occupy English Tangier, returning to England accompanying the Earl of Sandwich and the new Queen Catherine of Braganza. HMS Henry was severely damaged in the Four Days' Battle of 1–4 June 1666. On 13 June 1667, during the Raid on the Medway, HMS Henry was driven ashore at Rochester Bridge, Kent. She was accidentally burnt in 1682.

Notes

References

1656 works
1656 establishments in England
Ships of the line of the Royal Navy
1650s ships
Maritime incidents in 1666
Maritime incidents in 1667
Maritime incidents in 1682
Catherine of Braganza